Young ANO is a political youth organisation in the Czech Republic.  It is the youth wing of ANO 2011. It was established in 2015.

History
Young ANO was founded on 1 May 2015 on a Steamboat "Šumava" during 1 May celebration of ANO 2011. It had 120 members and Kateřina Reiblová became the first leader. She resigned in July 2015. Leader of ANO 2011 Andrej Babiš stated that she was disgusted by media. She was replaced by Tomáš Krátký who was elected new Chairman during the first Convention of Young ANO.

Chairmen
Kateřina Reiblová (2015)
Tomáš Krátký (2015-2016)
Jiří Till (Since 2016)

Footnotes

Politics of the Czech Republic
Youth politics
Youth wings of conservative parties
Youth wings of liberal parties
Youth wings of political parties in the Czech Republic
ANO 2011